is a Japanese high school in Sakado, Saitama, Japan. It follows the Japanese national curriculum. It is a member of Yamamura Gakuen, which includes Yamamura Gakuen College and Yamamura Gakuen High School.

History
In September 1922, Yamamura School was founded as a school for girls by Fumiyo Yamamura. In 1959, as another school opened in Kawagoe, Saitama, the school on the present site was renamed Yamamura Second Girls' High School. In 1991, the school was renamed Yamamura Kokusai Girl's High School and in 1991 it became co-educational: Yamamura International High School.

Present day
The school competes in national and international competitions. Its dance team competes nationally and regularly wins contests. They have risen over recent years and won the National DCC dance contest in 2021. They are frequently televised, appearing alongside Japanese idol dance groups. The wind ensemble’ successes are also prodigious They consistently appear in the Nippon Wind Orchestra Ensemble Contest arranged by Japan Musical Education and Culture Promotion Society, winning major awards in 2019 and 2020. Baton twirling and Yokasoi troupes, and biology club often shine on the national stage. 

The school has an advanced course, a life design course, an English course and a regular course. It promotes international understanding through sister school exchanges, foreign travel, and accepting students from overseas. 

The school purchased a second sports ground and has been promoting its baseball and soccer teams.

The school buildings have featured in Japanese film and television, including Mop Girl, Papa and Daughter's 7 Days and Kuro no Onna Kyōshi (2012).

References

External links
  

High schools in Saitama Prefecture
Schools in Saitama Prefecture
Sakado, Saitama
Educational institutions established in 1922